The A6 motorway, an Autobahn in Switzerland, connects Biel / Bienne over Bern with Thun. The A6 is located entirely within the Canton of Berne and, in particular, has a great regional significance, as only the section of Bern in the direction Berner Oberland is part of the Swiss national road system.

Route
The A6 is a Swiss motorway. Up until the mid-1990s it was called N6. This denomination is still used in certain documents. The A6 has two sections. the first section starts in Biel / Bienne and goes to Schönbühl. This section is a cantonal road belonging to the canton of Berne, but in 2014 it will be taken over by the Swiss government and thus turn into a national road. In Schönbühl the A6 joins the A1.

A few kilometers south, at the junction Bern-Wankdorf, the two motorways separate again. The A6 leads up the Aare valley to Thun, and from there to the junction of Lattigen near Spiez. At this junction, the A6 turns west to Wimmis while the motorway going south changes into the A8. It ends right after the Simmenfluh-Tunnel, where the road turns into a cantonal road. Earlier, there had been plans to continue the national road through the Simmental and then connect it with the Canton of Valais through the Rawil-Tunnel, but this project was abandoned in 1984. The road and the tunnel were never built.

In 2014, the names of the Swiss motorways will be slightly altered. The road that goes up to Kandersteg will be taken over by the Swiss Federation and will become part of the A6.

Junction list

External links
 Photos: A6 on Autobahnen.ch

  from the German Wikipedia.

A06